Implementation theory is an area of research in game theory concerned with whether a class of mechanisms (or institutions) can be designed whose equilibrium outcomes implement a given set of normative goals or welfare criteria.

There are two general types of implementation problems: the economic problem of producing and allocating public and private goods and choosing over a finite set of alternatives. In the case of producing and allocating public/private goods, solution concepts are focused on finding dominant strategies.

In his paper "Counterspeculation, Auctions, and Competitive Sealed Tenders", William Vickrey showed that if preferences are restricted to the case of quasi-linear utility functions then the mechanism dominant strategy is dominant-strategy implementable. "A social choice rule is dominant strategy incentive compatible, or strategy-proof, if the associated revelation mechanism has the property that honestly reporting the truth is always a dominant strategy for each agent." However, the payments to agents become large, sacrificing budget neutrality to incentive compatibility.

In a game where multiple agents are to report their preferences (or their type), it may be in the best interest of some agents to lie about their preferences.  This may improve their payoff, but it may not be seen as a fair outcome to other agents.

Although largely theoretical, implementation theory may have profound implications on policy creation because some social choice rules may be impossible to implement under specific game conditions.

References

Game theory